Klakksjorda or Klakkjorda (or unofficially Klaksjord) is a village in Bø Municipality in Nordland county, Norway.  The village is located along the Jørnfjorden in the southeastern part of the island of Langøya. Historically, the name was also spelled Klagsjord, Klachsiord, and Klachsjord.

The road leading out of Klakksjorda (called Klakksjordveien or "Klakksjord Road"), connects to Norwegian County Road 911 which connects it to other settlements on Langøya.

References

External links
Klakksjorda at Norgeskart

Bø, Nordland
Villages in Nordland